Jail is a 2021 Indian Tamil-language action crime film written and directed by Vasanthabalan. The film is produced by Sridharan Mariathasan under the production banner of Krikes Cine Creations. The film stars G. V. Prakash Kumar, with debutant Abarnathi, Radhika Sarathkumar,.  G. V. Prakash Kumar has composed music for the film. The film is edited by Raymond Derrick Crasta. The film was released on 9 December 2021 and received negative reviews from critics but praising GV Prakash's performance and message.

Plot
Three childhood friends get thrown out of their village under the guise of resettlement. In addition to adjusting to the new reality, they must fight for their rights and strive hard to make a living.

Cast

Production
It was announced that G. V. Prakash would act under the direction of Vasanthabalan. Prakash started his career as composer with Vasanthabalan's film Veyil (2006). Abarnathi, who rose to fame with the reality series Enga Veetu Mapillai, is making her cinematic debut as actress with this film.

Soundtrack
The soundtrack was composed by GV Prakash. Aditi Rao Hydari and Dhanush sang one song for the film.

Release

Reception
M.Suganth of Times of India who gave 2.5 out of 5 stars after reviewing the film stated that "Rather than sending chills, the climax only evokes a cold indifference." Indiaglitz gave a rating of 2.75 out of 5 stating that "Go for this one for the good performances and raw action." Srivatsan S of The Hindu after reviewing the film stated that "In the opening credits, Vasanthabalan credits a few people for their conversations. What a wonderful gesture I thought. Perhaps there is a downside too; you shouldn’t always go by hearsay."

Sudhir Srinivasan of Cinema Express gave 2 out of 5 stars stating that "The real jail, when you are exposed to such attempts at humour in a film that’s supposed to celebrate equality and empathy, is the movie theatre." Ashameera Aiyappan of Firstpost who gave 2.5 out of 5 stated after reviewing the film that "In an interview about Sarpatta Parambarai, director Pa Ranjith speaks about how his objective was to show how perishable progress is for people from vulnerable communities. They do not have space for mistakes or impulse; one minor misstep and the modest progress they had made can all come crashing down. Jail tries to explore this emotional landmine as well. In its writing, we see the frameworks of a strong emotional drama. But it never rises above that."
 
Behindwoods after reviewing the film gave 2.5 out of 5 stars stating that "Jail is a watchable drama for GV Prakash's acting and the message it delivers."

References

External links 

2021 films
2020s Tamil-language films
Indian action films
Films scored by G. V. Prakash Kumar
Films directed by Vasanthabalan